Dev 2 may refer to:

 Dev 2 (TV series), the second season of Dev
 Dev2.0, also Devo 2.0, a Disney quintet that sings and dances to Devo songs re-recorded by members of the original band
 F9R Dev2, Falcon 9 Reusable Development Vehicle version 2, also codenamed Grasshopper
 Dev-2, a concept car model from Daewoo
 Android Dev Phone 2

See also
 Dev (disambiguation)